is a side-scrolling platform game originally released in 1988 as a coin-operated arcade video game.

Home computer versions were released in Europe by U.S. Gold for the Amiga, Amstrad CPC, Atari ST, Commodore 64, MS-DOS, and ZX Spectrum. An alternate version for the Commodore 64 was released in the United States by Capcom who also published an Amiga 500 port of the game in that region.

A remade version for the PC Engine/TurboGrafx 16 was released in 1990 in Japan and North America. The original arcade game is included in Capcom Classics Collection Vol. 2 for the PlayStation 2 and Xbox.

Plot
In Tiger Road, the player is placed in the shoes of a master of the Tiger Technique of Oh-Lin.  Before the start of the game, the main character has been attacked by the warriors of the Dragon God, his sworn rivals.  His soldiers have been killed, his secrets have been stolen, and the children studying Oh-Lin have been kidnapped.  To win the game, the player must retrieve the stolen scrolls so that he can use the Double-Headed Tiger Fighting Technique to defeat the Dragon God, rescue the children, and reclaim his power.

Regional differences
The Japanese arcade release has additional sound hardware, allowing the game to play digital samples using an additional Z80 and MSM5205 digital sound chip.
The World and USA releases had this removed, and these releases do not play any samples, lowering the production cost of the PCB.

Reception
In Japan, Game Machine listed Tiger Road on their January 1, 1988 issue as being the eighth most-successful table arcade unit of the month. The game was reviewed in 1990 in Dragon #156 by Hartley, Patricia, and Kirk Lesser in "The Role of Computers" column. The reviewers gave the game 4 out of 5 stars.

References

External links
 
 Tiger Road at IGN
 Tiger Road Strategy Guide (TurboGrafx-16) at TurboPlay Magazine Archives

1987 video games
Action video games
Arcade video games
Capcom games
Commodore 64 games
DOS games
Amiga games
Amstrad CPC games
Atari ST games
Romstar games
TurboGrafx-16 games
U.S. Gold games
Video games developed in Japan
Video games scored by Harumi Fujita
ZX Spectrum games
Video games scored by Tamayo Kawamoto